Richard Beckhard (1918–1999) was an American organizational theorist, adjunct professor at MIT, and  pioneer in the field of organization development.

Beckhard co-launched the Addison-Wesley Organization Development Series and began the Organization Development Network in 1967. His classic work, Organization Development: Strategies and Models, was published in 1969. Beckhard was an adjunct professor at the MIT Sloan School of Management from 1963-1984. He died on December 28, 1999.

He helped to define organization development as: "an effort (1) planned, (2) organization-wide, (3) managed from the top, to (4) increase organization effectiveness and health through (5) planned interventions in the organization's 'processes', using behavioural-science knowledge". Together with David Gleicher, he is credited with developing a Formula for Change. The formula proposes that the combination of organisational dissatisfaction, vision for the future and the possibility of immediate, tactical action must be stronger than the resistance within the organisation in order for meaningful change to occur.

Beckhard is also credited for developing the GRPI model of team effectiveness, which highlights four key conditions (Goals, Roles, Processes, Interpersonal) for teams to succeed.

Another area of Beckhard's work was concerned with change and continuity within family-owned businesses.

Selected publications 
Books, a selection
 Beckhard, Richard. "Organization development: Strategies and models." (1969).
 Beckhard, Richard, and Reuben T. Harris. Organizational transitions: Managing complex change. Reading, MA: Addison-Wesley, 1977.
 Beckhard, Richard, and Wendy Pritchard. Changing the essence: The art of creating and leading fundamental change in organizations. Vol. 10. San Francisco: Jossey-Bass, 1992.
 Hesselbein, Frances, Marshall Goldsmith, and Richard Beckhard. The leader of the future. Jossey Bass, 1996.
 Louis L. Carter, Marshall Goldsmith, Jay Conger, and Richard Beckhard. Best Practices in Organization & Human Resources Development Handbook, Linkage Press, 2000.
Articles, a selection
 Beckhard, Richard, and Gibb Dyer Jr. "Managing continuity in the family-owned business." Organizational Dynamics 12.1 (1983): 5-12.

References

1918 births
1999 deaths
American business theorists
MIT Sloan School of Management faculty
20th-century American economists
American sociologists